Blšanka is a river, a right tributary of the Ohře, of the Ústí nad Labem Region in northwest Bohemia, in the Czech Republic. It is 50.8 km long, and its basin area is 483 km2. It flows into the Ohře near Žatec.

References

Rivers of the Ústí nad Labem Region